La Trinité is a town and commune in the French overseas region and department of Martinique.

Geography

Climate

La Trinité has a tropical rainforest climate (Köppen climate classification Af).

Population

Sport 
La Gauloise de Trinité is a multi-sport club in La Trinité.

Notable people 
 

 David Alerte (born 1984), Olympic athlete
 Christian André (born 1950), association footballer 
 Bruno Nestor Azerot (born 1961), politician, served in the French National Assembly as deputy of Martinique's 2nd constituency from 2012-2018
 Coralie Balmy (born 1987), Olympic swimmer
 Malick Bolivard (born 1987), association footballer
 Paul Chillan (1935-2021), association footballer
 Homère Clément (1852–1923), physician and politician, served in the French National Assembly as deputy of Martinique from 1902-1906
 Jeffrey Dalmat (born 1991), basketball player
 Lénora Guion-Firmin (born 1991), athlete
 Joan Hartock (born 1987), association footballer 
 Jacques Laposte (born 1952), association footballer 
 Yva Léro (1912–2007), writer and painter
 Audrick Linord (born 1987), association footballer
 Louis-Joseph Manscour (born 1945), politician, served in the French National Assembly as deputy of Martinique's 1st constituency from 2002-2012; member of the European Parliament from 2014-2019
 Guy-Marc Michel (born 1988), basketball player 
 Dominique Pandor (born 1993), association footballer
 Patrick Gilles Percin (born 1976), association footballer
 Katty Piejos (born 1981), handball player
 Olivier Rambo (born 1974), association footballer
 David Regis (born 1935), association footballer
 Auguste Rejon (1893-1973), politician, elected to the French Senate in 1958 
 Cédric Sorhaindo (born 1984), Olympic handball player

See also
Communes of the Martinique department

References

External links

Communes of Martinique
Populated places in Martinique
Subprefectures in France